The twenty-second season of the American animated television series The Simpsons began airing on Fox on September 26, 2010 and ended on May 22, 2011. The Simpsons was renewed for at least two additional seasons during the twentieth season leading up to this season. The cast is currently signed through the 34th season (though the show almost got canceled in its 23rd season due to budget constraints). On November 11, 2010, the series was renewed for a 23rd season by Fox with 22 episodes.

Episodes

Reception

Ratings
This season ranked 68th among overall viewers and thirtieth among viewers between the ages of 18 and 49.  The season averaged 7.28 million viewers in the overall viewership with an average of 3.3 rating/9% share in the demographic meaning that the season was watched by an average of 3.3% of households and 9% average of all televisions were tuned to the season when it was broadcast.

Reviews
The A.V. Club reviewer Rowan Kaiser rated the season with a B, tying for the second highest rated season of "Animation Domination" beating the ninth season of Family Guy, which received a C+, and tied with the seventh season of American Dad!, but was defeated by the inaugural season of Bob's Burgers which received a B+.

References

Bibliography

External links
Season 22 at The Simpsons.com

Simpsons season 22
2010 American television seasons
2011 American television seasons